The 2018–19 Junior ABA League is the second season of the Junior ABA League with twelve men's under-19 teams from Serbia, Croatia, Slovenia, Montenegro and Bosnia and Herzegovina. Teams are the junior selections of the 2018–19 ABA League First Division teams.

Competition
Twelve under-19 teams are participating at the 2018–19 Junior ABA League season and they are divided into two semi-final Groups. In the group stage, all teams will face each other team within a group in a round-robin system. The two best placed teams of each group will advance to the final tournament. At the final tournament, the teams will play two games – the semifinal and the final or third place game. The winner of the final tournament will become the 2018–19 ABA Junior Tournament Champion.

Teams

Team allocation

Locations and personnel

Group stage

Group A 
Venue: Bar, Montenegro

Group B 
Venue: Zadar, Croatia

Final Four

Bracket 
Venue: Slavonski Brod, Croatia

Source: Junior Adriatic League

Semifinals

Cedevita v Cibona

Crvena zvezda v Igokea

Third place

Final

Awards

See also 
 2018–19 ABA League First Division

References

External links 
 Official website

U19 ABA League Championship
Junior
2018–19 in European basketball leagues
2018–19 in Serbian basketball
2018–19 in Slovenian basketball
2018–19 in Croatian basketball
2018–19 in Bosnia and Herzegovina basketball
2018–19 in Montenegrin basketball